Ron Boszhard (born 12 November 1963) is a Dutch television presenter. He is best known for presenting the popular television shows Pluk de Dag, De Leukste Thuis (2000 – 2004) and Te land, ter zee en in de lucht (2007 – 2010).

He presented the television game show Bommetje! which was later adapted abroad as Cannonball in the United Kingdom and also as Cannonball in Australia. He also presented the second and third season, called Bommetje XL and Bommetje XXL respectively.

Career 

He was one of the Dutch presenters of the television show Spel zonder grenzen (originally called Jeux sans frontières). He also presented the show 1000 seconden in which contestants need to prepare a three course meal in at most 1000 seconds (16 minutes and 40 seconds).

In 2018, he participated in the 18th season of the popular television show Wie is de Mol?. In 2020, he appeared in a special anniversary edition of the show, called Wie is de Mol? Renaissance, which featured only contestants of previous seasons.

In 2019, he appeared as one of the Twelve Apostles in that year's edition of The Passion, a Dutch Passion Play held every Maundy Thursday since 2011.

Personal life 

Carlo Boszhard is his younger brother.

Filmography

As presenter 

 2000 – 2004: De Leukste Thuis
 2007 – 2010: Te land, ter zee en in de lucht

As contestant 

 2018: Wie is de Mol?
 2020: Wie is de Mol? Renaissance (anniversary season)

References

External links 
 

Living people
1963 births
Mass media people from Amsterdam
Dutch television presenters
21st-century Dutch people